A drawing pin (in British English) or thumb tack (in North American English) is a short nail or pin used to fasten items to a wall or board for display and intended to be inserted by hand, usually using the thumb. A variety of names is used to refer to different designs intended for various purposes.

Thumb tacks made of brass, tin or iron may be referred to as brass tacks, brass pins, tin tacks or iron tacks, respectively.
These terms are particularly used in the idiomatic expression to come (or get) down to brass (or otherwise) tacks, meaning to consider basic facts of a situation.

History 

The drawing pin was invented in name and first mass-produced in what is now the United States in the mid/late 1750s; it was first mentioned in the Oxford English Dictionary in 1759. It was said that the use of the newly invented drawing pin to attach notices to school house doors was making significant contribution to the whittling away of their gothic doors. Modern drawing pins were also found as standard in architects’ drawing boxes in the late 18th century.

Edwin Moore patented the "push-pin" in the US in 1900 and founded the Moore Push-Pin Company. Moore described them as a pin with a handle. In 1903, in the German town of Lychen, clockmaker Johann Kirsten invented flat-headed pins for use with drawings.

Design 
 

A drawing pin has two basic components: the head, often made of plastic, metal or  wood, and the body, usually made of steel or brass. The head is wide to distribute the force of pushing the pin in, allowing only the hands to be used. Many head designs exist: flat, domed, spherical, cylindrical and a variety of novelty heads such as hearts or stars. Drawing pin heads also come in a variety of colours. These can be particularly useful to mark different locations on a map. Some drawing pin designs have a portion cut out of the head and bent downward to produce a pin.

Domed or gripped heads are sometimes preferred over flat heads as dropped flat-headed pins may easily point upward, posing a hazard.
Drawing pins also pose a hazard of ingestion and choking, where they may do serious harm.

References

External links 

Products introduced in 1900
Fasteners
Stationery